Cedar Island National Wildlife Refuge, located in Carteret County, North Carolina, is on the end of a peninsula marking the southern end of Pamlico Sound. The dominant marsh plants include black needlerush, saltmarsh cordgrass, saltmeadow hay, and saltgrass. The woodland areas are dominated by loblolly, longleaf and pond pine. Live oak is also abundant on some upland sites. The marsh and surrounding waters provide wintering habitat for thousands of ducks and nesting habitat for colonial waterbirds.

Mammalian species that inhabit this refuge are gray squirrel, marsh rabbit, white-tailed deer, red fox, raccoon, bobcat, gray fox, nutria, beaver, muskrat, river otter, mink and opossum.

References
Refuge website

National Wildlife Refuges in North Carolina
Protected areas established in 1964
Protected areas of Carteret County, North Carolina
Wetlands of North Carolina
Landforms of Carteret County, North Carolina
1964 establishments in North Carolina